Bathybagrus tetranema is a species of claroteid catfish endemic to Lake Tanganyika where it has only been found in the waters within the borders of Zambia. It grows to a length of 17.0 cm (6.7 inches) SL.

References
 

Fauna of Zambia
Claroteidae
Fish of Lake Tanganyika
Fish described in 1984
Taxonomy articles created by Polbot